was a Japanese race car driver.

Career 
In 1982, he was runner-up in Japanese Formula 3. The following year, he ran a dual campaign, racing in the Grand Champion Series and also stepping up to Japanese Formula 2 (now Super Formula).

Takahashi was killed in the fourth and final round of the Grand Champion Series race at Fuji Speedway, Japan, in 1983, at the age of 23. Exiting the high-speed Last Corner, his flat-bottomed car spun, lifted and flew off the track, slamming top-first into a crowd fence. One unknown female spectator also died in the accident.  A chicane was installed in the final turn, and Hermann Tilke demolished the section in 2003 as part of a total circuit reconstruction.

Takahashi's final position in the 1983 Japanese Formula 2 season was fifth, with 49 points.

Racing record

Japanese Top Formula Championship results
(key) (Races in bold indicate pole position) (Races in italics indicate fastest lap)

References 

http://afw.fc2web.com/ziko/ziko1980.htm

External links

1960 births
1983 deaths
Japanese racing drivers
Racing drivers who died while racing
Sport deaths in Japan
Filmed deaths in motorsport
People from Hiroshima Prefecture
Sportspeople from Hiroshima Prefecture
People from Higashihiroshima